Antje Stille (born 8 September 1961) is a retired German swimmer. In February–March 1976 she set two world records in the 200 m backstroke. Later that year she competed at the 1976 Summer Olympics in the 100 m and 200 m backstroke events and finished in seventh and sixth place, respectively.

Currently she runs a dental clinic in Magdeburg.

Her stepmother Ursula Küper is also a retired Olympic swimmer.

References

1961 births
Living people
People from Salzwedel
People from Bezirk Magdeburg
German female swimmers
Female backstroke swimmers
Sportspeople from Saxony-Anhalt
Olympic swimmers of East Germany
Swimmers at the 1976 Summer Olympics
20th-century German women